Anthracokeryx is a genus of extinct artiodactyl ungulate mammal belonging to Anthracotheriidae that lived in Asia during the middle to late Eocene.

Taxonomy
Anthracokeryx was treated as a junior synonym of Anthracotherium by Tsubamoto et al. (2002) based on similarities in dental morphology. However, other authors have rejected the synonymy and recognized Anthracokeryx as a distinct form in the subfamily Microbunodontinae.

Distribution
Fossils of Anthracokeryx are known from China, Myanmar, and Vietnam.

References 

Anthracotheres
Eocene even-toed ungulates
Eocene mammals of Asia
Prehistoric even-toed ungulate genera